Jefimija Karakašević (born 13 August 1989) is Serbian female basketball player.

Personal life
Jefimija is a sister of Serbian basketball player Jovana Karakašević.

External links
Profile at eurobasket.com

1989 births
Living people
People from Senta
Serbian women's basketball players
Serbian women's 3x3 basketball players
Power forwards (basketball)
Centers (basketball)
ŽKK Partizan players
ŽKK Vojvodina players
ŽKK Voždovac players
Mediterranean Games silver medalists for Serbia
Competitors at the 2009 Mediterranean Games
Mediterranean Games medalists in basketball
European Games competitors for Serbia
Basketball players at the 2019 European Games
21st-century Serbian people